This is a List of awards and nominations received by Eric Clapton.

American Music Award

BAFTA Award

Baloise Session Award

Billboard Music Award

Blues Hall of Fame

BMI Film & TV Award

BMI Million Air Award

BPI Award

CableACE Award

DGA Television Award

Echo Music Prize

Golden Globe Award

GQ Award

Grammy Award

Grammy Hall of Fame

Grammy Lifetime Achievement Award

IFMCA Award

International Rock Award

Ivor Novello Award

Melody Maker Award

MTV Movie & TV Award

MTV Video Music Award

Music Assistance Program

OFTA Film Award

Primetime Emmy Award

Q Award

Robert Musel Award

Rock and Roll Hall of Fame

Rock Walk Award

Silver Clef Award

Songwriters Hall of Fame

W.C. Handy Award

World Music Award

Other awards and honours

Royal honours

Concert awards

Ranking lists

Other awards

References 

Eric Clapton
Clapton, Eric